Odisha Football Club is an Indian professional football club based in Bhubaneswar, Odisha, that competes in the Indian Super League, the top flight of Indian football. Prior to the inaugural Indian Super League season, the club was founded as Delhi Dynamos Football Club. The club renamed to Odisha Football Club, as it moved to its current base, the Kalinga Stadium in Bhubaneswar, Odisha.

Raj Athwal, former commercial head of Rangers, Watford, and Coventry City, is currently the club president. David Villa, former Spanish international and the founder of premium consulting agency DV7 Management, is the technical advisor and the head of global football operations.

History

Formation
In early 2014, it was announced that the All India Football Federation, the national federation for football in India, and IMG-Reliance would be accepting bids for ownership of eight or nine selected cities for the upcoming Indian Super League, an eight-team franchise league modeled along the lines of the Indian Premier League cricket tournament. On 13 April 2014, it was announced that DEN Networks had won the bidding for the Delhi franchise. The team had entered an alliance with Dutch club Feyenoord which lasted one year.

As Delhi Dynamos (2014−2019)
The team started their inaugural Indian Super League campaign on 14 October 2014 with a 0–0 draw against FC Pune City at the Jawaharlal Nehru Stadium, New Delhi. Dynamos did not experience the best of starts to their ISL campaign as they were placed last in the points table till the ninth game-week. But, against all the odds, the team finished fifth with a five-match unbeaten run which included three wins and two draws, but couldn't qualify for the semi-finals. In the 2015 season, Delhi Dynamos, for the first time, qualified for the semi-finals of the Indian Super League in 2015. In the 2016 season, the club finished third in the league stage with 21 points, but lost to Kerala Blasters FC in the semi-finals. In the 2017–18 season, the club finished eighth in the league stage with 19 points and couldn't qualify for semi-finals. In their last season under the Delhi Dynamos  banner, i.e. the 2018–19 season, the club again finished eighth in the league round with 18 points and therefore, couldn't qualify for the semi-finals.

As Odisha (2019−present)
Ahead of the 2019–20 Indian Super League season, the club decided to relocate to a new base, the Kalinga Stadium in Bhubaneswar, Odisha and rechristen itself as Odisha FC. In the presence of the Naveen Patnaik, the Chief Minister of Odisha, and Tusharkanti Behera, the Minister for Department of Sports and Youth Services (DSYS), Government of Odisha, the Delhi Soccer Private Limited signed a Memorandum of Understanding (MoU) with the Government of Odisha, to facilitate the relocation of the club from the national capital New Delhi to Bhubaneswar. As per the MoU, it was mutually decided that the club's first team, youth teams, youth football development program and grassroots football development program will be based in Odisha. Due to unavailability of the Kalinga Stadium, Odisha had to play three of their first home fixtures of the 2019−20 season at the Shree Shiv Chhatrapati Sports Complex Stadium in Pune, Maharashtra. Odisha started off their season on 22 October 2019, with a 2−1 loss in an away match against Jamshedpur at the JRD Tata Sports Complex. Odisha secured their first ever win in their third fixture registering a 4−2 victory against Mumbai City at the Mumbai Football Arena. Odisha ended the season at the sixth spot with 25 points. Later, on 18 March 2020, due to the head coach's familial obligations, Josep Gombau left the club. Stuart Baxter replaced Josep Gomabau on 19 June 2020, as he was announced as the head coach of Odisha in a two-year contract.
Due to the COVID-19 pandemic in India, the 2020−21 season was hosted behind closed doors across three venues in Goa, the Fatorda Stadium in Margao, the GMC Athletic Stadium in Bambolim, and the Tilak Maidan Stadium in Vasco da Gama. Due to inconsistent display throughout the season, Odisha FC ended up at the bottom of the league with twelve points. On 2 February 2021, Baxter was sacked for his comments in a post-match press conference.

On 20 July 2021, Odisha announced the appointment of Francisco "Kiko" Ramírez González as the head coach for 2021–22 Indian Super League season along with the appointment of Assistant Coach and Head of Football Development, Joaquin "Kino" Garcia Sanchez. On 1 September 2021, the club entered into a 3-year international partnership deal with Premier League club Watford. On 4 November 2021, the club announced the finalisation of a strategic football and commercial partnership with Brazil's Avaí Futebol Clube as a part of OFC's Global Football Alliance initiative. Odisha began the 2021–22 season campaign win a historic 3–1 win over Bengaluru FC on 24 November. Odisha ended the season at the seventh spot with 23 points.

At the end of 2022-23 Indian Super League, Odisha finished 6th with 30 points in the table and qualified for the playoffs for the first time since rebranding into Odisha FC. They however lost to ATK Mohun Bagan 2-0 in the Knockouts.

Crest, colours and kits

Crest 

On 15 September 2019, Odisha unveiled their official logo embodying the heritage and the culture of the state of Odisha and the vision and the ideology of its parent company, GMS Inc. Design of the crest is inspired from the Chakras or the chariot wheels of the famous Konark Sun Temple, a World Heritage Site in Odisha which represents movement and development; the ship design represents GMS, world’s largest buyer of ships and offshore assets, and the owner of the club.

Kit evolution

Kit manufacturers and shirt sponsors

Stadium

Established in 1978, the Kalinga Stadium in Bhubaneswar, is the home ground of Odisha. The 15,000-capacity stadium has hosted several national and international tournaments including the I-League, Super Cup, and Women's Gold Cup. It was one of the venues to host the 2022 FIFA U-17 Women's World Cup. The stadium is also the home base for the national and youth team camps. Indian Arrows, AIFF's developmental side, is also based at the Kalinga Stadium.

On 31 August 2019, the Kalinga Stadium was announced as the home base of the club. Earlier, the 60,000-capacity Jawaharlal Nehru Stadium in New Delhi, served as the home ground of the club, under the brand franchise name Delhi Dynamos FC. In 2019, due to various economic factors and improper attendance for home games over the course of the seasons at the Jawaharlal Nehru Stadium, the then owner of the franchise, Dr. Anil Sharma, decided to shift the base from Delhi to Bhubaneswar, and rechristen the club as Odisha FC.

Support

Odisha FC had immediately grown its popularity post its inception which resulted in the formation of its supporters group, named The Juggernauts. Juggernaut is defined as a large powerful force or organization that cannot be stopped. After the club entered into a 3-year technical affiliation with the Premier League side Watford, the Juggernauts became the first Indian football supporters' group to get into an international alliance with supporters' group of a foreign club on September 3. They partnered with Watford’s largest supporters' group, i.e. The 1881 Movement, for a cross-cultural fan exchange programme.

Ownership
On 13 April 2014, IMG Reliance announced that DEN Networks had won the bidding for the Delhi franchise to be the eighth team in the inaugural season of Indian Super League. The club entered an alliance with Dutch club Feyenoord in 2015, which lasted only for one year. World's largest cash buyer of ships and offshore assets for recycling, GMS, was brought in March 2016 as club's new majority co-owner. GMS currently holds 100% of the ownership in club which it purchased in three installments of 55%, 25% and 20% respectively from DEN Networks.

Records and statistics

Players

First-team squad

Out on loan

Reserves

Player of the Season

Personnel

Current technical staff

Managerial history

Football Sport Management

Management

Board of Directors

eSports

The organizers of ISL introduced eISL, a FIFA video game tournament, for the ISL playing clubs, each represented by two players. Odisha FC hosted a series of qualifying games for all the participants wanting to represent the club in eISL. On 20 November, the club announced the signing of the two players.

Roster

Affiliated clubs
The following clubs are affiliated with Odisha FC:
  Watford FC (2021–present)
  Avai FC (2021–present)

References

External links

Odisha FC's ISL Profile

 
Football clubs in Odisha
2019 establishments in Odisha
Indian Super League teams